Froukje Wegman (born 22 April 1979 in Gouda) is a Dutch rower. She is notable for having won a bronze medal in Rowing at the 2004 Summer Olympics – Women's eight.

Wegman is a graduate of Syracuse University in New York, earning her degree in 2001.

References

External links
 
 

1979 births
Living people
Dutch female rowers
Sportspeople from Gouda, South Holland
Rowers at the 2004 Summer Olympics
Olympic bronze medalists for the Netherlands
Olympic rowers of the Netherlands
Olympic medalists in rowing
Medalists at the 2004 Summer Olympics
20th-century Dutch women
21st-century Dutch women
Syracuse Orange rowers